James Bruce Reid (20 December 1912 – 10 December 1992) was an Australian rules footballer who played with North Melbourne in the Victorian Football League (VFL).

The son of William Bruce Reid (1882–1957) and Lorna Mary Reid, nee Innes (1878–1929), James Bruce Reid was born at Katanning, Western Australia on 20 December 1912. The Reid family moved to Victoria in the late 1920s and settled in the Bendigo region.

Jim Reid also served in the Royal Australian Navy during World War II.

Notes

External links 

1912 births
1992 deaths
Australian rules footballers from Victoria (Australia)
North Melbourne Football Club players